I/O is a Japanese science fiction visual novel produced by Regista. It was released by GN Software for the PlayStation 2 on January 26, 2006 and by Asgard for Microsoft Windows on August 29, 2008 under the title I/O Revision II.

Gameplay 
I/O is a mystery adventure visual novel in which the player takes the role of one of four characters; depending on who they choose in the beginning of the game, they experience different scenarios. At certain points throughout the game, the player needs to select one of two choices in order to move the plot forward. In order to reveal the truth behind the game's story, the player needs to clear all four routes.

Plot

Setting and characters 

The player also encounters Hinata's childhood friend .

Development 

I/O was developed by Regista, and was directed and written by Takumi Nakazawa, based on an original concept by Nakazawa and Romeo Tanaka, and features character designs by Soyosoyo. The game was inspired by a Mesopotamian poem, the Epic of Gilgamesh. It features full voice acting for all characters, including the protagonists.

The game was announced in March 2005, and originally had a planned release window of the third or fourth quarter of 2005; it was showcased at Sega's booth at Tokyo Game Show 2005 in September, and was eventually released by GN Software for PlayStation 2 on January 26, 2006, in both a standard and a limited edition. A Microsoft Windows version, titled I/O Revision II, was released by Asgard on August 29, 2008. The game's soundtrack album, I/O Perfect Audiotracks, and the drama CD I/O Overbrowse Damsel, were both released by Five Records on February 24, 2006.

Reception 

Writers for the Japanese video game magazine Famitsu appreciated how new developments occur after clearing each of the game's scenarios, and found that the game's worldview was consistent despite referencing various conflicting texts, such as the Bible and the Epic of Gilgamesh. They also felt that the game's use of themes such as virtual and real, human life and ontology gave the game a "cyber-science fiction youth" feeling.

References

External links
Official website for the original version 
Official website for Revision II 

2006 video games
Japan-exclusive video games
PlayStation 2 games
Video games developed in Japan
Video games featuring female protagonists
Video games set in 2032
Video games set in Tokyo
Visual novels
Windows games